Jean-Pierre Willem, born 24 May 1938 at Sedan, France, is a doctor and founder of Médecins Aux Pieds Nus. He led numerous humanitarian missions to help victims of catastrophes and conflicts. Willem also was a doctor of medicine and president of Organic Union International.

Biography
In 1959, Jean-Pierre Willem coorganised the departure of 93 medical students to help local population during the Algerian War.
In 1964, Dr Jean-Pierre Willem was missioned six months with Doctor Albert Schweitzer in Lambaréné (Gabon) and then in Rwanda.
In 1977, he worked with Bernard Kouchner for Médecins Sans Frontières and went to Laos during 7 months. 
In 1986, he created the Faculté Libre de Médecine Naturelle et d'Ethnomédecine (nicknamed FLMNE), a free faculty of natural medicine.
In 1987, he founded a non-profit organisation called Médecins Aux Pieds Nus, translatable as Barefoot doctors.

Willem met several humanitarian people during his life, such as Che Guevara, Abbé Pierre, Sœur Emmanuelle, Jean-Paul Belmondo and Mother Teresa.
Willem co-founded the phyto-hormones selling company Aromalia. He collaborated  with André Gernez as President of Organic Union International in 2007.

Hypothesis
 Nutrition and aromatherapy are preventive against degenerative disease.
 Médecins Aux Pieds Nus is a concept of proximity, prevention and humility: ''being balanced, motivated and empathic are qualities required to be a humanitarian doctor

Experiments
Experiments on rats or rabbits shows :
 93% of cancer decrease with Acidosis protocol, fasting and nutriments.
 50%  of cancer decrease with an annual fasting: one month of abstaining from the third of the food ration when the spring begins.

Bibliography
Here is a non-exhaustive list of the books published by Doctor Jean-Pierre Willem:
 Prévenir et vaincre le Cancer, Guy Trédaniel, 2004, 
 Le Secret des Peuples Sans Cancer, Le Dauphin, réédition 2005, 
 Les Secrets du Régime Crétois, Le Dauphin 1999, 
 Les Huiles Essentielles, médecine d'avenir, Le Dauphin 2002, 
 Les Antibiotiques Naturels, Sully 2003, 
 Au Diable Arthrose et Arthrite, Robert Jauze 2003, 
 Aroma-minceur, Éditions Albin Michel - 2004, 
 Aroma-stress, Éditions Albin Michel – 2005, 
 Aroma-famille, Éditions Albin Michel – 2005, 
 Aroma-allergies, Éditions Albin Michel – 2005, 
 Ensemble, sauvons notre planète (ouvrage collectif) Guy Trédaniel 2005, 
 L’Ethnomédecine, une alliance entre science et tradition, Jouvence & Biocontact - 2006, 
 100 maladies du XXIè siècle Solutions Naturelles, éditions Testez – 2008, 
 Mémoires d'un médecin aux pieds nus, édition Éditions Albin Michel - 2009, .

Footnotes

See also 
 Albert Schweitzer
 Alain Deloche
 Bernard Kouchner

External links 
 Willem biography on MAPN website 
 

1938 births
Living people
French urologists
Academic staff of the University of Paris
French pacifists
French Roman Catholics
French humanitarians
20th-century French physicians
21st-century French physicians